International Bodo Festival is a traditional festival of the Bodo-Kachari people. It is held every year in different parts of Northeast India. Many tribesman of the Bodo race performs at this festival. It includes Bagurumba dance of Bodo people, Wangala dance of the Garo people and Bohuwa dance of the Sonowals etc.

References

External links 

Festivals in India
Bodo